L. lutea may refer to:

 Lachenalia lutea, an African plant
 Lachesis lutea, a venomous pitviper
 Leiothrix lutea, a bird native to the Indian subcontinent
 Lepidagathis lutea, a dicotyledonous plant
 Lepiota lutea, a poisonous fungus
 Lithosia lutea, an Afro-Eurasian moth
 Litoria lutea, an Oceanian frog
 Littoraria lutea, a sea snail
 Lonchoptera lutea, a spear-winged fly
 Loxosceles lutea, a recluse spider
 Lumnitzera lutea, a flowering plant
 Luzula lutea, a perennial plant